Argentum Fondsinvesteringer is a Norwegian government enterprise that participates as a minority owner in private equity funds. The goal of the company is to stimulate to create private equity investment groups in Norway, develop high research competence and to receive high return of capital from investments. The company is based in Bergen and is owned by the Ministry of Trade and Industry. It was founded in 2001.

Per 2010, the company had 16 employees.

References

External links
www.argentum.no

Private equity companies of Norway
Holding companies of Norway
Government-owned companies of Norway
Financial services companies established in 2001
Norwegian companies established in 2001